Beatrice of Vienne (1160–1230) was a Countess of Savoy by marriage to Humbert III, Count of Savoy.

Biography
Beatrice was born in 1160 in Vienne, France, the second child of Géraud I of Mâcon (son of William III of Mâcon) and Maurette de Salins. She was descended from the House of Mâcon and had seven siblings.

After the death of Humbert III, Count of Savoy's third wife, Clementia of Zähringen, in 1175, Humbert was inconsolable and refused to remarry; however, he had no male heir. His advisers persuaded him to wed Beatrice the following year. Beatrice gave birth to Thomas, Count of Savoy in 1178.

Beatrice died in 1230 in Champagne-et-Fontaine, Aquitaine, France.

References

1160 births
1230 deaths
Countesses of Savoy
12th-century French women
12th-century French people
13th-century French women
13th-century French people
Burials at Hautecombe Abbey